State Road 916 (SR 916), locally known as Northwest 138th Street, West 84th Street, North 135th Street, Opa-locka Boulevard, and Natural Bridge Road is a  long east–west highway crossing northern Miami-Dade County, Florida.  Its western terminus is at an interchange with Interstate 75 (I-75), the Palmetto Expressway (SR 826), and the Gratigny Parkway (SR 924) on the boundary between Hialeah and Miami Lakes, traveling east to Biscayne Boulevard (U.S. Route 1 (US 1)/SR 5).

Route description
The road begins at an interchange with Interstate 75 (SR 93), the Palmetto Expressway (SR 826), and the Gratigny Parkway (SR 924). However, SR 916 only has access to the northbound Palmetto Expressway, and receives traffic from the southbound lanes of the expressway. State Road 916 heads east as a two lane road, first through residential areas alongside SR 924.  Once SR 916 passes under SR 924, the road enters a commercial area/industrial park, and intersects State Road 823, gaining a lane east of the intersection, before striding the southern end of Opa-locka Airport in Opa-locka, providing access via Le Jeune Road (State Road 953).  Just east of this intersection, SR 916 transitions back into suburban residential neighborhoods for the rest of the route, with business scattered throughout the road.  Just east of Aswan Road, State Road 916 becomes a one-way pair for the next three miles, with westbound lanes one block north, as it crosses State Road 9, US 441/State Road 7, and I-95.  The roads reunite four blocks east of I-95, with SR 916 continuing east, with intersections with State Road 915, State Road 909, before its eastern terminus according to FDOT maps, at Biscayne Boulevard (U.S. Route 1/SR 5) in North Miami.

As with SR 976 to the southwest, there is an ambiguity as to the location of the eastern terminus of SR 916.  Florida Department of Transportation maps and literature indicate that SR 916 terminates at its intersection with Biscayne Boulevard; however, signs erected by FDOT near the intersection indicate that the State Road extends past US 1 to some point on the street that ends in a cul-de-sac a mile to the east.

History
The significance of SR 916 to Miami-Dade County has diminished since the opening of the Gratigny Parkway in 1992, but it remains a major trans-county throughway.

Major intersections

References

External links

916
916